Love Me and the World Is Mine is a 1928 American silent romantic film directed by Ewald André Dupont (E.A. Dupont) and released by Universal Pictures.

Plot
Hannerl (Philbin) is a young woman growing up in Old Vienna. She falls in love with two men: A young army officer who can provide her love and security and an old wealthy man who can provide her a high-class life. She doesn't know who she wants to spend her life with, but must make her decision.

Cast
 Mary Philbin as Hannerl
 Norman Kerry as Von Vigilatti
 Betty Compson as Mitzel
 Henry B. Walthall as Van Denbosch
 Mathilde Brundage as Mrs. Van Denbosch
 Charles Sellon as Mr. Thule
 Martha Mattox as Mrs. Thule
 George Siegmann as Porter

Preservation status
The film survives in copies held at Cinematheque Royale de Belgique, Brussels and the Danish Film Institute, Copenhagen.

Cast
 Hannerl and Her Lovers (1921)
 Hannerl and Her Lovers (1936)

References

External links

1928 romantic drama films
American romantic drama films
American silent feature films
Films directed by E. A. Dupont
American black-and-white films
Films set in Vienna
Films set in the 1910s
Films based on Austrian novels
American remakes of German films
Universal Pictures films
1928 films
1920s American films
Silent romantic drama films
Silent American drama films